Gerald Dial (born November 17, 1937) is an American politician who served in the Alabama Senate from the 13th district from 2010 to 2018. He previously served in the Alabama House of Representatives from 1974 to 1982 and in the Alabama Senate from 1983 to 2006.

References

1937 births
Living people
Democratic Party members of the Alabama House of Representatives
Democratic Party Alabama state senators